Hubbard House may refer to:

Hubbard House (Jacksonville, Florida), domestic violence shelter
Hubbard House (Crescent City, Florida), historic building
Hubbard House (Hudson, Illinois), historic building
Hubbard House (Brooklyn, New York), historic building
Hubbard House (Mankato, Minnesota), historic building

See also
Hubbard-Upson House, Sacramento, California, listed on the National Register of Historic Places (NRHP) in Sacramento County, California
John Hubbard House, Lakeville, Connecticut, a contributing building in Lakeville Historic District
Coite-Hubbard House, Middletown, Connecticut, NRHP-listed 
Nehemiah Hubbard House, Middletown, Connecticut, NRHP-listed
Joel H. Hubbard House, St. Charles, Illinois, listed on the NRHP in Kane County, Illinois
Hubbard-Dawson House, Holden, Massachusetts, NRHP-listed
Hill Cemetery and Parson Hubbard House Historic District, Shelburne, Massachusetts, NRHP-listed
Paddock-Hubbard House, Concord, Michigan, listed on the NRHP in Jackson County, Michigan
Hubbard-Kesby House, Milford, Michigan, listed on the NRHP in Oakland County, Michigan 
Thomas Russell Hubbard House, Manchester, New Hampshire, listed on the NRHP in Hillsborough County, New Hampshire
Hubbard Hall (Elizabethtown, New York), NRHP-listed
Chase-Hubbard-Williams House, Lockport, New York, NRHP-listed
Benjamin Hubbard House, Moravian Falls, North Carolina, listed on the NRHP in Wilkes County, North Carolina
Johnson-Hubbard House, Wilkesboro, North Carolina, listed on the NRHP in Wilkes County, North Carolina
Col. William Hubbard House, Ashtabula, Ohio, listed on the NRHP in Ashtabula County, Ohio
 Hubbard House Underground Railroad Museum, Ashtabula, Ohio, one of Ohio's museums
Lester Hubbard House, Sandusky, Ohio, listed on the NRHP in Erie County, Ohio
S. B. Hubbard House, Sandusky, Ohio, listed on the NRHP in Erie County, Ohio
William and Mabel Donahoo Hubbard House, Grandfield, Oklahoma, listed on the NRHP in Tillman County, Oklahoma
 Hubbard House (Nashville, Tennessee), listed on the NRHP in Davidson County, Tennessee
Hubbard-Trigg House, Bastrop, Texas, listed on the NRHP in Bastrop County, Texas
Hubbard Bungalow, Centralia, Washington, listed on the NRHP in Lewis County, Washington  
 Hubbard House (Washington, D.C.)